HKM may refer to:

 Hassan Khoyihami Memorial College, Bandipora, Jammu and Kashmir, India
Human Killing Machine, a fighting video game released in 1989
 Hykeham railway station, in England